The men's team sabre was one of eight fencing events on the fencing at the 1980 Summer Olympics programme. It was the sixteenth appearance of the event. The competition was held from 28 to 29 July 1980. 63 fencers from 8 nations competed.

Rosters

Results

Round 1

Round 1 Pool A 

Cuba defeated Romania 9–7, followed by Romania defeating the Soviet Union 9–7. In the final match of the pool, Cuba needed a win to take first place while the Soviet team needed to reach at least 10 bouts won to guarantee first place (a 9–7 Soviet win would result in a three-way tie, broken by touches). The Soviets got to 10–5 to win the pool, with the final bout unnecessary.

Round 1 Pool B 

Poland defeated East Germany 9–7, followed by East Germany and Bulgaria tying 8–8 (with 63 touches apiece). Poland defeated Bulgaria 9–7 to win the pool. East Germany and Bulgaria were tied on matches, bouts, and touches received, but East Germany had 2 more touches scored than Bulgaria (having scored 60–62 against Poland, to Bulgaria's 58–62).

Round 1 Pool C 

In the only match of the pool, Italy defeated Hungary 8–7. (The final bout was unnecessary, as Italy's 65–52 touches lead ensured that Italy would win the tie-breaker even if Hungary won the last bout 5–0.)

Elimination rounds

References

Fencing at the 1980 Summer Olympics
Men's events at the 1980 Summer Olympics